Escadrille Spa.93 (originally Escadrille N.93) was a French fighter squadron active during World War I from 26 April 1917 until war's end. On 4 October 1918, they were Mentioned in dispatches for their battle performance. By the 11 November 1918 ceasefire, the escadrille was credited with the destruction of 35 enemy aircraft.

History

At the VII Armee airfield of Corcieux, detachments N501 and N506 were melded into a Nieuport squadron, Escadrille N.93, on 26 April 1917. It was one of the squadrons merged into Groupe de Combat 15 on 27 July 1917 to support II Armee. In November 1917, they began to re-equip with new fighters, both SPAD S.7s and SPAD S.13s, and became Escadrille Spa.93. The squadron continued to serve as part of Groupe de Combat 15 even as the Groupe was consolidated into Escadre de Combat No. 1. On 4 October 1918, the Escadre and its constituent units were Mentioned in dispatches. By war's end on 11 November 1918, Escadrille Spa.93 was credited with 35 aerial victories.

Commanding officers
 Lieutenant Jean Moreau: 26 April 1917 - 26 August 1918
 Lieutenant Jean-Louis Moy: 26 August 1918 - 18 October 1918
 Lieutenant Charles Lafarge: 18 October 1918 - war's end

Notable members
 Corporal Eugene Bullard
 Sous lieutenant Gustave Daladier
 Adjutant Pierre Delage
 Sergeant Pierre Ducornet

Aircraft
 Nieuports: 26 April 1917 - c. November 1917
 SPAD S.7: c. November 1917 - war's end
 SPAD S.13: c. November 1917 - war's end

End notes

Reference
 Franks, Norman; Bailey, Frank (1993). Over the Front: The Complete Record of the Fighter Aces and Units of the United States and French Air Services, 1914–1918 London, UK: Grub Street Publishing. .

Fighter squadrons of the French Air and Space Force
Military units and formations established in 1917
Military units and formations disestablished in 1918
Military units and formations of France in World War I
Military aviation units and formations in World War I